Sinocrossocheilus labiatus is a species of cyprinid of the genus Sinocrossocheilus. It inhabits China's Tongzi river, is considered harmless to humans and has not been evaluated on the IUCN Red List.

References

Cyprinid fish of Asia
Freshwater fish of China
Fish described in 2003